Holiday Soul could refer to either of the following two albums of Christmas music released on the Prestige label:
Holiday Soul (Bobby Timmons album)
Holiday Soul (Don Patterson album)